Anatoliy Zayaev (October 27, 1931 – December 18, 2012) was a Soviet football player and a Ukrainian coach. Merited Coach of Ukraine.

Biography
Zayaev was born in Simferopol in a big assyrian family. Participant of World War II. His father was shot in 1938, his younger brother Oleksandr was killed during the German occupation of Crimea, and his older brother Oleksiy perished in March 1945 in Germany.

Zayaev graduated from the Simferopol State University and then worked at the city's meat factory. Simultaneously he was a player and administrator of the factory's team "Pishchevik". With his participation the Simferopol's team was accepted to play in the Class B of the Soviet competitions in 1958. In 1962 Tavriya placed third in the final stage of the Ukrainian championship. After that Zayaev left the team. On multiple occasions he was fired many times from the team's staff position.

Tavriya started off very bad the 1963 season and for a long time could not win after which Antonin Sochnev was fired, while Zayaev returned to the team. He was an acting head coach and after his first game away the team won. The team started to revive and was able to avoid relegation. According to own admission Zayaev started to work as a coach since 1973 as he stashed a great deal of knowledge.

During Soviet times Zayaev won the Ukrainian championship on several occasions, the Cup of the Ukrainian SSR, the Ukrainian Spartakiad, led teams to the top of the Soviet First League and semifinals of the Soviet Cup. Until the 1990s he worked for SC Tavriya Simferopol as the team director. In 1992, he became famous by obtaining the national title when SC Tavriya Simferopol beat FC Dynamo Kyiv in Lviv. After 1995 Zayaev once again became not needed.

After that went to Chisinau to coach the local Constructorul Chisinau in 1996-97. The next season Zayaev led MFK Mykolaiv to the top of the Ukrainian First League. In 1998-99 he coached Prykarpattia. After that Zayaev returned to Tavria for couple of more seasons. After being let go in 2005, Zayaev initiated the creation of a new club in Yalta, FC Yalos Yalta, head coach of which was appointed Oleksandr Haydash. Although the team placed fourth in its first season in the Ukrainian Second League, it has folded and did not participated in the following seasons. After that Zayaev created another club near Bakhchisaray, IKS-Academy Kuibysheve.

In 2010 the head coach of MFK Mykolaiv Ruslan Zabransky acquired him as a coach-consultant. In 2012 Zayaev worked in Metalurh Zaporizhia.

Death
He was killed in a traffic accident on Tuesday evening December 18, 2012, while driving own vehicle. The accident took place on the highway Kharkiv - Simferopol less than a mile away from Melitopol. Zayaev who was driving Honda CR-V to Simferopol went into the oncoming traffic lane and collided with a towing truck that was moving towards Zaporizhia. From the collision the towing truck caught fire and its driver burned inside.

Coaching style
Due to the fact that Zayaev did not have a specialized education, he often was called a "self-taught" coach. He considers psychology as the basis for building training process, an ability to manage human relationships. In recognition of the former players "Tavriya", Zayayev required result not only in the successful performance of the team on the field, but also by the ability to build relationships with football referees.

Honours

Achievements
 Higher League of Ukraine 
 Winner: 1992
 Ukrainian Cup
 Final: 1993-94

Recognition and awards
 Merited Coach of Ukraine
 Merited Coach of Moldova
 Order of Merit 2nd and 3rd degrees

Private life
His wife Alla is seven years younger than him. His son was the president of SC Tavriya Simferopol (January 1992 - May 1994) and was killed on May 1, 1994. He was survived by his wife and two children.

Letter to the President of Ukraine (Viktor Yanukovych)
A year before his death, Zayaev wrote a letter to the President of Ukraine Viktor Yanukovych asking to take under own control the investigation of his son's murder case. In the letter Zayaev not only identified killers who as he claimed were known to him, but also particular officials: judge, prosecutor, investigator, SBU agents who were covering the killers.

References

External links
 It is necessary to fight on two frontlines . "Karpaty info center". April 27, 2012.

1931 births
Soviet football managers
Ukrainian football managers
FC Chayka Sevastopol managers
SC Tavriya Simferopol managers
MFC Mykolaiv managers
FC Spartak Ivano-Frankivsk managers
FC Polissya Zhytomyr managers
FC Dnipro Cherkasy managers
FC Metalurh Zaporizhzhia managers
2012 deaths
Ukrainian Premier League managers
Ukrainian First League managers
Sportspeople from Simferopol
Tavrida National V.I. Vernadsky University alumni
Merited Coaches of Ukraine
Ukrainian people of Assyrian descent
Road incident deaths in Ukraine